Coutras is a commune in the Gironde department in Nouvelle-Aquitaine in southwestern France. Coutras station has rail connections to Bordeaux, Angoulême, Périgueux, Brive-la-Gaillarde and Limoges.

History
The Battle of Coutras, one of the most important battles of the French Wars of Religion, was fought there on 20 October 1587.

Population

See also
 Communes of the Gironde department

References

Communes of Gironde